Armenia has been competing at the Deaflympics since its debut at the Deaflympics in 2001. Armenia won their first Deaflympic medal in 2013, for the wrestling event; this is also the only medal received by Armenia at the Deaflympics to date.

Involvement

Armenia made its debut at a Winter Deaflympics event in 2015, though has been involved in the Deaflympics games since 2001.

Medal tallies

Summer Deaflympics

Medals at each sports events

See also 
 Armenia at the Olympics
 Armenia at the Paralympics

References

External links 
 2017 Deaflympics

Nations at the Deaflympics
Armenia at multi-sport events